East African mole-rat has been split into the following species:
 Northeast African mole-rat, Tachyoryctes splendens
 Ankole African mole-rat, Tachyoryctes ankoliae
 Mianzini African mole-rat, Tachyoryctes annectens
 Aberdare Mountains African mole-rat, Tachyoryctes audax
 Demon African mole-rat, Tachyoryctes daemon
 Kenyan African mole-rat, Tachyoryctes ibeanus
 Navivasha African mole-rat, Tachyoryctes naivashae
 King African mole-rat, Tachyoryctes rex
 Rwanda African mole-rat, Tachyoryctes ruandae
 Embi African mole-rat, Tachyoryctes spalacinus
 Storey's African mole-rat, Tachyoryctes storeyi